Caladenia attingens, commonly known as mantis orchid, is a species of flowering plants in the orchid family Orchidaceae and are endemic to the south-west of Western Australia. There are three subspecies, each of which has a single hairy leaf and one or two brightly coloured flowers with upswept sepals and a labellum with long, comb-like fringes. The subspecies differ in size, distribution and habitat.

Description
The lower part of the leaf often has reddish blotches.

The flowers are green, white and yellow with reddish-purple areas. The labellum is greenish-yellow with a red tip and four or more rows of dark red calli along its centre. The sides of the labellum bear long, green, comb-like teeth. Flowering occurs between August and November.

Taxonomy and naming
Caladenia attingens was first formally described by Stephen Hopper and Andrew Brown in 2001 and the description was published in Nuytsia. The specific epithet (attingens) is a Latin word meaning "reaching to" or "attaining", referring to the calli which extend as far as the tip of the labellum.

When Hooper and Brown described the species, they also described two subspecies, C. attingens subsp. attingens and C. attingens subsp. gracillima. Since then, a third subspecies has been described by Andrew Brown and Garry Brockman and given the name C. attingens subsp. effusa.

Distribution and habitat
Mantis orchids occur between Perth and Israelite Bay, growing in a range of habitats, depending on subspecies.

Conservation
All three subspecies of Caladenia attingens are classified as "Not Threatened" by the Western Australian Government Department of Parks and Wildlife.

References

attingens
Endemic orchids of Australia
Orchids of Western Australia
Plants described in 2001
Taxa named by Stephen Hopper